Tillman Road Wildlife Management Area is a  conservation area located within the Town of Clarence in Erie County, western New York. It is managed by the New York State Department of Environmental Conservation.

Geography

The Tillman Road site is located in the southeast part of Clarence, south of NY-5 (Main Street) and north of the New York State Thruway. Tillman Road is located in the eastern projection of Wildlife Management Unit 9C.

Public use

The WMA is bisected by Tillman Road, where one centrally located parking area is located. A second parking area is located on Bergtold Road at the north end of the preserve.

The preserve is crossed by several trails, including two loops of different lengths. A short section of boardwalk and a viewing platform are located by Bergtold Road. Parts of some trails are elevated on narrow boardwalks due to marshy conditions.

Permissible activities within the WMA include hiking, nature observation, photography, fishing, snowshoeing, and cross country skiing.

See also
 List of New York state wildlife management areas

External links
 NYS Department of Environmental Conservation: Tillman Road Wildlife Management Area

 

Marshes of New York (state)
Wildlife management areas of New York (state)
Protected areas of Erie County, New York
Landforms of Erie County, New York